Luís Fernando de Sousa Pires de Goes commonly known as Luiz Goes (5 January 1933 – 18 September 2012) was a Portuguese fado singer.

References

1933 births
2012 deaths
People from Coimbra
Portuguese fado singers